John Michael Whelan (born 1960) is the General Secretary of the British trade union ASLEF. He is the 18th General Secretary of ASLEF.

Early life
Whelan was born in Paddington to Irish parents and grew up in North West London. His mother worked in a sweet shop at Euston station and his father was a bricklayer. Whelan credited his father with politicising him, although both his parents had left-wing views: his father was a member of the Socialist Workers Party whilst he described his mother's beliefs as "hard Labour". He passed his eleven-plus and attended London Oratory School: he planned to attend university after leaving school, however he entered employment instead after his father suffered injuries from a fall from some scaffolding and was unable to continue working.

Career
He began working in the rail industry in 1984, becoming a train driver. Previously he had been a bank clerk.

ASLEF
Whelan was elected General Secretary of ASLEF on 11 October 2011, when he received 3683 votes compared to 3458 for Simon Weller. Previously he had been Midlands District Organiser (ASLEF District 6) for the union. In the first ballot on 19 September 2011 he received 3,284 votes, against 3,115 for Simon Weller. He became General Secretary on 5 December 2011.

He is also Editor of Aslef Journal (a nominal position for the General Secretary), published by TU ink.

Personal life
Whelan is a supporter of Chelsea football club.

He is married to Lorraine Phelan MBE, the Chief Biomedical Scientist for special haematology at St Mary's Hospital, London. They live at a house in Wembley and have two boys including a son born in 1995.

References

External links
 Mick's Column at ASLEF
 Twitter

News items
 London Midland in March 2011

Video clips
 Justice for Colombia in September 2012 (introduced by Billy Hayes)

1960 births
General secretaries of the Associated Society of Locomotive Engineers and Firemen
People from Wembley
British train drivers
Living people
People educated at London Oratory School
People from Paddington
English people of Irish descent